Ángel Ramiro Pulgar Araujo (born 7 February 1989, in Barquisimeto) is a Venezuelan track cyclist. At the 2012 Summer Olympics, he competed in the Men's team sprint for the national team. At the 2016 Summer Olympics, he competed in the team sprint and the men's keirin.

Palmarès

2008
Cuban National Track Championships
2nd Sprint
3rd 1 km time trial
2009
Venezuelan National Track Championships
1st 1 km time trial
2nd Keirin
2nd Sprint
2010
Pan American Road and Track Championships
1st Team sprint (with César Marcano and Hersony Canelón)
2nd 1 km time trial
2011
Pan American Road and Track Championships
 1st 1 km time trial
Venezuelan National Track Championships
1st 1 km time trial
1st Keirin
2nd Sprint
1st Clasico Aniversario De La Federacion Veneolana De Ciclismo
2012
Venezuelan National Track Championships
1st 1 km time trial
1st Sprint
3rd Keirin
2013
Pan American Road and Track Championships
2nd 1 km time trial
2017
1st Stage 6 Vuelta Ciclista a Venezuela (Cagua - Altagracia de Orituco)

References

External links
 
 
 
 

Venezuelan male cyclists
1989 births
Living people
Olympic cyclists of Venezuela
Cyclists at the 2011 Pan American Games
Cyclists at the 2012 Summer Olympics
Cyclists at the 2015 Pan American Games
Cyclists at the 2016 Summer Olympics
Cyclists at the 2019 Pan American Games
Venezuelan track cyclists
Sportspeople from Barquisimeto
Pan American Games medalists in cycling
Pan American Games gold medalists for Venezuela
Pan American Games silver medalists for Venezuela
Medalists at the 2011 Pan American Games
Medalists at the 2015 Pan American Games
21st-century Venezuelan people
Competitors at the 2010 Central American and Caribbean Games
Competitors at the 2014 Central American and Caribbean Games
Competitors at the 2018 Central American and Caribbean Games